NGC 2685 (also known as the Helix Galaxy) is a lenticular and polar ring Seyfert Type 2 galaxy in the constellation Ursa Major. It is about 50,000 light-years across and about 42 million light-years away from Earth. It is receding from Earth at 883 kilometers per second. It is an object of great scientific interest, because polar-ring galaxies are very rare galaxies. They are thought to form when two galaxies gravitationally interact with each other. "The bizarre configuration could be caused by the chance capture of material from another galaxy by a disk galaxy, with the captured debris strung out in a rotating ring. Still, observed properties of NGC 2685 suggest that the rotating ring structure is remarkably old and stable."

Allan Sandage referred to NGC 2685 as "perhaps the most peculiar galaxy in the Shapley-Ames Catalog".

Gallery

References

External links
 

NGC 2685
NGC 2685
2685
336
Ursa Major (constellation)
025065